Milk Cow Blues is the 48th studio album from American country singer Willie Nelson, released on September 19, 2000, on the Island Records label. It features many famous blues artists, including B. B. King and Dr. John.

Track listing

Personnel
Willie Nelson - guitar
Derek O'Brien - guitar
Jimmie Vaughan - guitar
Kenny Wayne Shepherd - guitar
Riley Osbourn - B-3 organ, piano
George Rains - drums
Mickey Raphael - harmonica
John Blondell - bass guitar

Chart performance

References

External links
Willie Nelson's Official Website

2000 albums
Willie Nelson albums
Island Records albums